Elbasan castle is a 15th-century fortress in the city of Elbasan, Albania. Part of Via Egnatia passes through the castle Foundations. The Elbasan Castle was built upon Roman and Byzantine Foundations and the original settlement was built in the 3rd century.There were periods of settlement in Elbasan castle. 3-4th century,5-6th century and finally 11-15th century and finally the ottoman era.

Sinan Pasha's Turkish bath is within the walls of the castle. It is a well-preserved attraction built in the early 19th century.

References

See also
 Elbasan
 List of castles in Albania

Buildings and structures completed in the 15th century
Castles in Albania
Buildings and structures in Elbasan
Ottoman fortifications
Tourist attractions in Elbasan County